Christopher David Armstrong (born 8 November 1984) is an English former footballer.

Club career

Armstrong started his career at Leeds United and featured for the reserves before being released by the club in May 2004. He joined Rochdale soon after before signing for Scottish First Division club Queen of the South in August.

He joined Galway United, having previously played with St Patrick's Athletic since July 2005. His previous clubs include Rochdale, Queen of the South and Stockport County.

He was released by Galway United in 2007.

References

External links

Chris Armstrong at GalwayUnitedFC.ie
Chris Armstrong at StPatsFC.com

1984 births
Living people
English footballers
Sportspeople from Durham, England
Footballers from County Durham
Leeds United F.C. players
Rochdale A.F.C. players
Stockport County F.C. players
Queen of the South F.C. players
St Patrick's Athletic F.C. players
Galway United F.C. players
League of Ireland players
English Football League players
Scottish Football League players
Association football forwards
Expatriate association footballers in the Republic of Ireland